Shin Kanemaru (金丸 信 Kanemaru Shin, 17 September 1914 – 28 March 1996) was a Japanese politician who was a significant figure in the political arena of Japan from the 1970s to the early 1990s. He was also Director General of the Japan Defense Agency from 1977 to 1978.

Early life and education
Kanemaru was born in Suwa village (now Minami-arupusu city), Yamanashi Prefecture on 17 September 1914. He began his studies at the Tokyo University of Agriculture and became a teacher upon graduation.

Career 
He was conscripted into the army and served briefly in the Kwantung Army as a sergeant from 1937 to 1938.  He was discharged due to illness and returned to Japan. After his military service, he entered into the sake brewing business and was later involved in the concrete and souvenir businesses. He was a member of the Liberal Democratic Party and a member of the faction of Noboru Takeshita.

Arrest and indictment 
In 1992, he was indicted in the Sagawa Kyubin corruption scandal. He was charged with evading taxes on payments he had received from construction companies that were seeking political influence. He resigned and was arrested on 13 March 1993 after authorities found at least $51 million in bearer bonds and hundreds of pounds of gold stored at his home.

Personal life 
He has a son, Shingo Shin. Kanemaru died in Yamanashi on 28 March 1996 at the age of 81.

References

Sources 
 William H. Cooper, Japan-U.S. Trade: The Construction Services Issue, U.S. Congressional Research Service: Report for Congress 93-957, November 4, 1993.

1914 births
1996 deaths
Politicians from Yamanashi Prefecture
Members of the House of Representatives (Japan)
Ministers of Construction of Japan
Deputy Prime Ministers of Japan
Japanese defense ministers
Japanese politicians convicted of corruption
Japanese people convicted of tax crimes
People convicted of bribery
Liberal Democratic Party (Japan) politicians
Imperial Japanese Army soldiers
Military personnel of the Second Sino-Japanese War
Members of the Kwantung Army